Front Sight Firearms Training Institute, also known as Front Sight and as Front Sight Resorts, was founded in 1996 by Dr Ignatius Piazza. Piazza made promises of lifetime memberships that allowed for unlimited training in exchange for a one time fee. Front Sight declared bankruptcy in May 2022 and was acquired by PrarieFire Nevada in Dec 2022.

Location
Front Sight currently operates one location, its main location near Pahrump, Nevada. A second location in Nikiski, Alaska was closed in 2022 amid bankruptcy filings.

History
In 1998, a  property in Nye County, between Las Vegas, Nevada and Pahrump, Nevada (near Nevada State Route 160 and Tecopa Road) was purchased and the operation gradually moved there. This location, called "Front Sight Nevada", provides facilities for training in firearms as well as climbing, rappelling, and other forms of self-defense.

In early 2012, Texas news sources revealed preliminary agreements had been signed for a Front Sight Texas campus, to be located in East Montgomery County.

Notable events
In 2006, Mark Wahlberg attended sniper shooting classes at Front Sight to prepare for the 2007 movie Shooter, despite a felony conviction which legally prohibits him from handling firearms. That same year, Piazza and Front Sight were sued in a class action by certain members of the "First Family", an exclusive membership to the Front Sight facility, for failing to deliver on expectations made when the memberships were purchased. A settlement was reached in 2007.
 
On May 11, 2009, due to Front Sight's legal counsel failing to appear to a hearing, Judge James Ware of the U.S. District Court for Northern California ordered a temporary receiver be appointed to Front Sight.  This case is related to the class-action suit, brought by plaintiffs, regarding a multimillion-dollar shortfall in the class-action fund. On May 18, 2009, Front Sight's legal counsel appeared at a settlement hearing and Judge James Ware discharged the interim receiver, leaving Front Sight in control of all aspects of its business.  The termination of the receivership was made after the court received a copy of the receiver's report and based upon evidence presented at the May 18 hearing.

On January 22, 2022, Front Sight notified its members via email of restructuring. The restructuring includes substantive changes in value and new charges to members who purchased their memberships under previous terms of purchase. The changes include but are not limited to:

On May 24, 2022, Front Sight Firearms Training Institute filed for bankruptcy.

On Dec 5, 2022, it was announced that Front Sight had been acquired by PrarieFire Nevada, who is immediately taking over all operations. PrarieFire will continue "to deliver to everyone passionate about shooting sports the very best training, experiences, and competitions, typically only available to military and law enforcement heroes", with future plans "to make the beautiful Pahrump Valley a destination for those interested in an adventure-seeking outdoor lifestyle." The founder of Front Sight, Ignatius Piazza, is not involved in any way with PrarieFire, as clarified in a FAQ emailed to members on Dec 7.

Other services
Firearms training manuals were printed by Front Sight.

References

Self-defense
Shooting sports organizations
Firearm training
Privately held companies based in California
Shooting ranges in the United States
Companies that filed for Chapter 11 bankruptcy in 2022